Highway 120 is a provincial highway in the northeast region of the Canadian province of Saskatchewan. It runs from Highway 55 near Prince Albert to Highway 920 within the Narrow Hills Provincial Park.

Highway 120 intersects Highway 791, Highway 926, Highway 265, Highway 913, Highway 928, Highway 106, and Highway 920. The highway also passes through a small part of the Candle Lake Provincial Park.

References

120